Oakville may refer to:

Australia
Oakville, New South Wales, a suburb of Sydney, Australia

Canada
Oakville, Manitoba
Oakville, Ontario, a town in Halton Region, Ontario
Oakville GO Station, a station in the GO Transit network located in the community
Oakville (electoral district), a provincial and federal electoral district which includes this town
Oakville (provincial electoral district), Ontario, Canada
Oakville—Milton, a defunct federal electoral district which included this town

United States
Oakville, Alabama
Oakville, California, in Napa County
Oakville AVA, an American Viticultural Area
Oakville, Connecticut
Oakville, Indiana
Oakville, Iowa
Oakville, St. Mary's County, Maryland
Oakville, Michigan
Oakville, Missouri, an unincorporated suburb of St. Louis
 Oakville, Tennessee
Oakville, Texas, an unincorporated community in northeastern Live Oak County
 Oakville, Virginia
Oakville, Washington